Surgut Airport , also listed as Surgut North Airport, is an airport in Khanty-Mansi Autonomous Okrug, Russia located  north of Surgut. It services medium-sized airliners. In 2018 Surgut Airport handled 1,758,310 passengers. In May 2019, the airport was named after Farman Salmanov, a renowned Azerbaijani geologist.

Characteristics

Surgut International Airport has runway that can accommodate modern aircraft, such as Boeing-737, Boeing 757, Boeing 767, Airbus A319, Airbus A320, Airbus A321, Airbus A330, as well as helicopters of all types.

The airport's capacity is 660 passengers per hour for domestic flights and 200 passengers per hour for international flights.

In the terminal building, there are VIP, as well as shops, cafes, pharmacies. Wi-Fi access is also provided.

History

1931–2001

In 1931, arrival of the first aircraft to the village of Surgut.

In 1937, the first building of the Surgut airport was built and put into operation.

In 1964, Surgut United Air Squadron was established.

In 1970, the State Commission commissioned the runway of the new city airport.

In 1972, first regular flight Surgut-Moscow performed by Tu-134 airplane.

In 1975, commissioning of a new terminal building at the Surgut airport.

In 1979, installation, on the facade of the terminal, a mosaic panel - to a woman with a child in the window of the porthole "Surgut Madonna".

In 1998,  Airport Surgut was awarded a certificate of honor at the results of the contest "The Best Airport in 1998 in CIS countries".

In 2000, Airport Surgut is recognized as the winner in the contest "The best airport of the year of the CIS countries" in the nomination "Intensively developing airport".

2001–present

In 2001, Surgut Airport is open for international flights. The first flight was made by the airline "Utair" UT 777 - Kyiv (Boryspil).

In 2003, overhaul of the runway.

In 2004, full commissioning of the airport complex of the Surgut airport.

In 2007, opening of the telescopic ladder "Thyssen Krupp Airport Systems".Putting into operation of an automated vehicle access control system to the station square.

In 2008, Surgut airport for the first time congratulated the millionth passenger serviced during the year.

In 2009, creation and beginning of production activity of branches. Formed five branches: Berezovsky, Cape Kamensky, Noyabrsk, Tazovsky, Nefteyugansk.

In 2011, the hall of the waiting area for passengers of the international sector was built and put into operation. The duty-free shop "Duty-Free" opened in the international sector of the terminal.

In 2012, Airport Surgut started servicing domestic and international long-haul wide-body aircraft Boeing-767-200, Boeing 767-300.

According to the results of work in 2015, the passenger traffic of Surgut Airport (including branches of the company) amounted to 1,976,389 people, exceeding the total of 2014 by 3.8%.

Airlines and destinations

Statistics

2015

Accidents and incidents
On 1 January 2011, Kolavia Flight 348 suffered an explosion and fire at Surgut. The aircraft was taxiing before departing Surgut on a flight to Domodedovo International Airport, Moscow when the fire started and quickly engulfed the entire plane, which then burned to the ground. Despite a quick evacuation, 3 persons were killed.

See also

List of the busiest airports in Russia
List of the busiest airports in the former USSR

References

External links

Official website

Airports built in the Soviet Union
Airports in Khanty-Mansi Autonomous Okrug
Surgut